The 1968 United States Senate election in New Hampshire took place on November 5, 1968. Incumbent Republican Senator Norris Cotton won re-election to a third full term.

Primary elections
Primary elections were held on September 10, 1968.

Democratic primary

Candidates
John W. King, incumbent Governor of New Hampshire

Results

Republican primary

Candidates
Norris Cotton, incumbent United States Senator
John C. Mongan, former Mayor of Manchester, New Hampshire

Results

General election

Results

See also 
 1968 United States Senate elections

References

Bibliography
 
 
 

1968
New Hampshire
United States Senate